Barton, Irlam and Higginson was a noted Liverpool firm of shipowners specializing in the trade with Barbados in the first half of the 19th century. The three partners were William Barton, George Irlam, and John Higginson. The firm made a practice of naming several of its vessels after the partners.

Higginson may have joined the partnership around 1808. In that year the ownership of the ship Maxwell changed from Higginson to Barton & Co., and her master changed from J. Edwards to J. Irlam.

Although Liverpool was an important center for Britain's slave trade, and Barbados an important destination for slave ships, the partnership does not appear to have engaged in slave trading. Two of the vessels the partners bought had been slave traders, but were not once the partners bought them. Captain John Gillespie (or Gilespy) of Barton, the ship the partners purchased in 1810 and trading between Liverpool and Bridgetown, was involved in 43 transactions involving manumissions of slaves in Bridgetown between 1806 and 1818. The firm, however, did lend to Barbados plantations, all of which employed slaves.

Sir William Barton, then head of Barton, Irlam and Higginson, died aged 70 in 1826. He had been knighted in 1816 when Mayor of Liverpool on presenting an address of congratulation to the Regent on the marriage of Princess Charlotte of Wales.  When Barton died, Irlam and Higginson took up his shares in the vessel Higginson. George Irlam died before John Higginson, who died in 1834. His son Jonathon succeeded him as a partner in the firm.

Bankruptcy
Fiat in Bankruptcy was issued on 13 November 1847 against Jonathan Higginson and Richard Deane of Liverpool carrying on business at Liverpool under the firm of Barton, Irlam and Higginson, and at Barbadoes under the firm of Higginson, Deane & Stott.

Barton, Irlam and Higginson meet with considerable opposition in the Liverpool District Court of Bankruptcy. Reportedly, they had received a large quantity of sugar from Mr Hinds, of Barbadoes, in June 1847, pledged it in July for £20,000, and in August got a further advance of £30,000, at the same time owing Mr Hinds a large balance.

When Barton, Irlam and Higginson failed it had liabilities of £850,119, of which the Royal Bank of Liverpool held £545,791. (The bankruptcy occurred during the great railway panic of 1847 and the Bank suspended operations between 18 October and 1 December. It then operated until it finally failed in 1867. The bank's failure resulted in the failure of the White Star Line.)

The Official Assignee announced in 1851 a dividend of 20s (sic) on the pound. Actually, the dividend amounted to 17s 6d in the pound.

The bankruptcy was still  underway in 1870. In 1895 the Official Receiver was still negotiating with Jonathan Higginson's widow Charlotte over stock of the North-Eastern Railway Co. Jonathon, who had died in 1859, had on his own account purchased shares in the Leeds and Thirsk Railway, with which the North-Eastern Railway Company later merged. At the time of the merger the value of the new shares in the merged railway was £3087. However, the railway never paid out the dividends accruing to those shares with the result that by 1895 the shares and accrued dividends were worth about £7000. Charlotte Higginson and the Receiver agreed to divide this amount, with Charlotte getting £3087 plus the last six years of accrued dividends, and the Receiver the remainder.

The accounts of the Assignees were last reported audited in 1897.

Ships
 
{| class="sortable wikitable"
|-
! Vessel name
! Tons(bm)
! Launched 
! End year
! Notes
|-
| 
| 212/222
| 1794
| 1810
| Sold c. 1810.
|-
| 
| 440
| 1810
| 1836
| Wrecked
|-
| 
| 401
| 1805
| 1813
| Former slave ship; Barton & Co. owned between 1809 and loss in a hurricane
|-
| 
| 429
| 1796
| 1802–1803
| West Indiaman. Sold.
|-
| 
| 454
| 1814
| 1856
| Sold in 1848 after the company's bankruptcy in 1847; last listed in 1856
|-
|  
| 380
| 1800
| 1812
| Wrecked
|-
| 
| 407
| 1813
| 1824
| Wrecked 
|-
| 
| 299
| 1825
| 1831
| Wrecked in the Great Barbados Hurricane of 1831
|-
| 
| 326
| 1798
| 1814
| Launched in America; Higginson owned to 1808, then Barton & Co. until 1813; lost off Borcum on 16 January 1814 while sailing from Liverpool to Bremen.<ref>[https://hdl.handle.net/2027/mdp.39015024214275?urlappend=%3Bseq=465 Register of Shipping (1815), Seq. №887.]</ref>
|-
| 
| 371/386
| 1800
| 1819
| Launched at Liverpool; Barton & Co.-owned from 1807; lost on 30 September 1819 near the Saltee Islands returning to Liverpool from Barbados. Only four of the 30 crew and passengers aboard survived.
|-
|}

Citations and references
Citations

References
Welch, Pedro L.V., with Richard A. Goodridge (2000) "Red" and Black Over White: Free Coloured Women in Pre-Emancipation Barbados''. (Carib Research and Publications). 

Defunct companies based in Liverpool
Defunct shipping companies of the United Kingdom
Transatlantic shipping companies
1847 disestablishments in England